The Principal Clerk of Session and Justiciary is the clerk of court responsible for the administration of the Supreme Courts of Scotland and their associated staff. The Keeper of the Signet grants a commission to the Principal Clerk of Session to allow Her Majesty's Signet to be used.

Gillian Prentice was the first woman to hold the post. The Principal Clerk  is Pam McFarlane.

The modern office unites the originally separate offices of Principal Clerk of Session (of the Court of Session) and Principal Clerk of Justiciary (of the High Court of Justiciary).

The Crown Agent takes directions from the Principal Clerk of Justiciary when arranging sittings of the High Court of Justiciary.

List of office holders

 Sir James Dalrymple, son of the eminent legal scholar and statesman Lord Stair
 Sir John Dalrymple of Kelloch
 Sir Walter Scott, novelist (appointed 1806)
 David Hume, advocate and legal scholar (appointed 1811)
 James Fergusson, judge and legal scholar (appointed 1826)
 Thomas Thomson, advocate (1826–1852)
 Cosmo Innes (appointed 1852)

References